The 1975–76 SK Rapid Wien season was the 78th season in club history.

Squad

Squad and statistics

Squad statistics

Fixtures and results

League

Cup

UEFA Cup

References

1975-76 Rapid Wien Season
Rapid